Thomas Bay is a bay located in Southeast Alaska.  It lies northeast of Petersburg, Alaska and the Baird Glacier drains into the bay.  Thomas Bay is also known as "The Bay of Death" due to a massive landslide in 1750.  It also gained the name of "Devil's Country" several people claimed to have seen devil creatures in the area in 1900.

The bay is named for U.S. Navy officer Charles M. Thomas.

Natural history

Thomas Bay is known for being rich in gold and quartz. The wildlife of the area includes moose, brown bears, black bears, squirrels, wolves, rabbits, and other common Alaskan creatures. The land in the area has been used for logging.

Bay of Death

In 1750, a native (Tlingit) village on Thomas Bay was completely buried by a large landslide. Over 500 Alaska Native people died in the natural disaster.  From that day on the bay was dubbed "The Bay of Death" (or "Geey Nana" in the Tlingit language.).

Devil's Country

In 1900, the first documented account of the legendary devil creatures of the Thomas Bay area was written by Harry D. Colp. Colp and three of his prospecting friends identified only as Charlie, John, and Fred, were staying in Wrangell, Territory of Alaska. As the story goes, Charlie received word from an Alaska Native of the Thomas Bay area to mine for gold there.

Charlie went to check out the native man's story of the gold that was to be found in the mountains in May 1900. When he returned in June 1900, he arrived without a coat or his hat, and his canoe was empty except for a large piece of quartz.

Moon Lake and the Devil Creatures
Charlie claimed to have arrived in Thomas Bay, but could not find the half-moon shaped lake.  Instead he spent some time off an S-shaped lake (actually called Ess Lake).  He claimed that the surrounding area seemed oddly devoid of life; there were no squirrels, no birds, etc.  Wanting to get his bearings after he found the large chunk of quartz he later brought back in his canoe, he climbed to the top of a ridge.  From there he could spot Frederick Sound, Cape of the Straight Light, the point of Vanderput Spit (Point Vanderput), and Sukhoi Island from the mouth of Wrangell Narrows.  Behind the ridge, Charlie finally spotted the half-moon shaped lake, which is where the Patterson Glacier ends at a lake which drains into the Patterson River.

It was from this point that Charlie claims that a swarm of "devil creatures" were making their way up the ridge from the half-moon shaped lake. Charlie claimed that he barely managed to outrun the strange creatures and that he received several scratches along his back from them.  He never returned to the area.

Strangest Story Ever
The people who have had encounters with these creatures seem to go into hysterics and are usually deemed "temporarily insane." The creatures have always been described as looking neither like man or monkey, but covered with coarse hair and oozing sores. They are foul smelling.

In 1925, a trapper reported losing a dog in the hills around Thomas Bay, but finding strange tracks, with the hind feet resembling a cross between a bear's and a human's footprints. The trapper returned later to find the traps he had hastily left; some were sprung, some were not. Some were destroyed. He set out to try to find his dog, and was never seen again.

In 1974 Harry Colp's daughter Virginia was interviewed by writer Irving Warner in Petersburg, Alaska. She had helped her father in the production of the story, and was extremely familiar with it. She was sure of the  basic veracity of her father's narrative with regard to how he saw and lived it. She said that she could not, and would not, say whether her father′s story was true, false, or some sort of mental aberration. She did, however, express confidence in her father's abilities and truthfulness. Naturally, she had fielded many questions about it afterwards. She did say that large amounts of arsenic were alleged to be present in the watershed at Thomas Bay, which might or might not help to explain the strange events reported by visitors. (addition by I.W.)

See also
 Bigfoot
 Devil

References

External links
 Tides: Thomas Bay, Alaska
 Strangest Story Ever Told
 The Devil's Territory
 Kushtaka Cave
 Stikine Glacial Chronologies

Bays of Alaska
Bodies of water of Petersburg Borough, Alaska